Masters M35 javelin throw world record progression is the progression of world record improvements of the javelin throw M35 division of Masters athletics.  Records must be set in properly conducted, official competitions under the standing IAAF rules unless modified by World Masters Athletics.

The M35 division consists of male athletes who have reached the age of 35 but have not yet reached the age of 40, so exactly from their 35th birthday to the day before their 40th birthday. The M35 division throws an 800 g implement.  These competitors threw their world record performances in Open competition.  Železný's current world record was set while winning the 2001 World Championships in Athletics.

Key

References

External links
Masters Athletics Javelin Throw list
All Time Athletics

Masters athletics world record progressions
Javelin